Gigg is a suburban area of Bury, a town in Greater Manchester, England.

It is possibly best known for the football ground of Bury F.C., which is situated in, and named after, the area, Gigg Lane.

Areas of Greater Manchester
Geography of the Metropolitan Borough of Bury
Bury, Greater Manchester